Dennis Paul Andrew Lens  (born 25 September 1977) is a former Dutch badminton player. He competed at the 2000 Summer Olympics in the men's doubles event partnered with Quinten van Dalm. Lens won the boys' singles bronze at the 1995 European Junior Championships in Nitra, and was part of the Netherlands national team that won the mixed team bronze at the 2000 European Championships in Glasgow. He had collected 10 times national titles, 9 in the men's doubles event and once in the mixed doubles event.

Achievements

European Junior Championships 
Boys' singles

IBF International
Men's doubles

Mixed doubles

References

External links
 
 

1977 births
Living people
People from Heemskerk
Sportspeople from North Holland
Dutch male badminton players
Olympic badminton players of the Netherlands
Badminton players at the 2000 Summer Olympics